Pope Felix could refer to:

Pope Felix I (269–274)
Antipope Felix II (355–365)
Pope Felix III (483–492)
Pope Felix IV (526–530)
Antipope Felix V, Amadeus VIII, Duke of Savoy (1439–1449)

Felix